Halgerda indotessellata is a species of sea slug, a dorid nudibranch, a shell-less marine gastropod mollusk in the family Discodorididae.

Distribution
It has frequently been identified in the Indian Ocean as the Pacific Ocean species Halgerda tessellata.

References

Discodorididae
Gastropods described in 2018